Hieracium rossicum is a species of flowering plant belonging to the family Asteraceae.

It is native to Eastern Europe.

References

rossicum